Terrence Jennings (born July 28, 1986) is an American taekwondo practitioner. He began competing internationally in 2003 and qualified for the 2012 Summer Olympics. At the 2012 Summer Olympics, he qualified for the repechage in the 68 kg lightweight division by losing to the eventual gold medalist Servet Tazegül. Jennings won one of two bronze medals in that division by landing a three-point headshot with the score tied and one second left in the bronze medal match against Diogo Silva of Brazil. The other bronze medal in the division was awarded to Rohullah Nikpai.

References 

American male taekwondo practitioners
Taekwondo practitioners at the 2012 Summer Olympics
Olympic bronze medalists for the United States in taekwondo
Sportspeople from Alexandria, Virginia
1986 births
Living people
Medalists at the 2012 Summer Olympics
Pan American Games bronze medalists for the United States
Pan American Games medalists in taekwondo
Taekwondo practitioners at the 2015 Pan American Games
Universiade medalists in taekwondo
Universiade bronze medalists for the United States
Medalists at the 2009 Summer Universiade
Medalists at the 2011 Pan American Games
21st-century American people